Blue sage is a common name for several plants and may refer to:

Eranthemum nervosum
Salvia azurea, native to central and eastern North America
Salvia clevelandii, native to western North America
Salvia nemorosa, native to central Europe and western Asia
Salvia pachyphylla, native to California, Nevada, and Arizona